Lolita (born ), formerly known as Tokitae, is a female orca from the L pod of Southern resident orcas. She has been in captivity at the Miami Seaquarium in Florida since September 24, 1970. As of 2022, Lolita is the second oldest orca in captivity behind Corky at SeaWorld San Diego.

Life
Lolita is a member of the L Pod of southern resident orcas. She was captured from the wild on August 8, 1970 in Penn Cove, Puget Sound, Washington as part of the Penn Cove capture when she was approximately four years old. Lolita was one of seven young orcas sold to oceanariums and marine mammal parks around the world from a capture of over eighty whales conducted by Ted Griffin and Don Goldsberry, partners in an operation known as Namu, Inc. Lolita is the second oldest known living Southern resident orca as of 2022 after L-25 "Ocean Sun", who is speculated to be Lolita's mother. 

Lolita was purchased by Miami Seaquarium veterinarian Dr. Jesse White for about $20,000. Upon arrival to the Seaquarium, Lolita joined a male southern resident orca named Hugo who was also captured from Puget Sound and had lived in the park two years before her arrival. She was originally called "Tokitae," which in the Chinook language means "Bright day, pretty colors". However, she was renamed Lolita after the heroine in Vladimir Nabokov's novel.

The Lummi Nation of Washington refer to Lolita as Sk'aliCh'elh-tenaut, or, a female orca from an ancestral site in the Penn Cove area of the Salish Sea bioregion. They view her as a member of their "qwe lhol mechen," which translates to 'our relative under the water,' according to former Lummi tribal chairman Jeremiah "Jay" Julius.

The pair mated many times (once to the point of suspending shows) but they never produced any offspring. Hugo died on March 4, 1980, after a brain aneurysm occurred from the whale repeatedly ramming his head into the side of the tank. Thereafter, Lolita then shared the tank with a short-beaked common dolphin and a pilot whale during the 1980s and 1990s, and today lives with a pair of pacific white-sided dolphins.

On March 4, 2022, the Miami Seaquarium announced Lolita will no longer be on public display or used for staged exhibition shows under a new license with the United States Department of Agriculture (USDA).

Controversy

Animal rights groups and anti-captivity activists assert that Lolita is being subjected to cruelty. In 2003, she was the subject of the documentary Lolita: Slave to Entertainment. in which many anti-captivity activists, most notably Ric O'Barry (former Flipper dolphin trainer), argue against her current conditions and express a hope that she may be re-introduced to the wild. 

On January 17, 2015, thousands of protesters from all over the world gathered outside the Miami Seaquarium to demand for Lolita's release and asked other supporters worldwide to tweet "#FreeLolita" on Twitter.

In 2017, a USDA audit found that Lolita's tank does not meet the legal size requirements per federal law.

In 2018 the Lummi Nation traveled to Seaquarium with a totem pole carved for Sk'aliCh'elh-tenaut, sang to her, and prayed that she would be returned to the Salish Sea Bioregion. According to journalist Lynda Mapes, "The Seaquarium would not allow tribal members any closer than the public sidewalk outside the facility where the whale performs twice a day for food." Seaquarium Curator Emeritus Robert Rose responded to the Lummi's journey, saying that the Lummi Nation "should be ashamed of themselves, they don't care about Lolita, they don't care about her best interests, they don't really care whether she lives or dies. To them, she is nothing more than a vehicle by which they promote their name, their political agenda, to obtain money and to gain media attention. Shame on them." In response, environmental scholars and Julius have argued that such statements are representative of a troubling pattern of discounting Native American knowledge and relationships, theft, and possession, which are "part and parcel of the possessive nature of settler colonialism."

On September 24, 2020, the 50th anniversary of Lolita's arrival at the Seaquarium, tribal members of the Lummi Nation, joined by the local Seminole, travelled to Miami again, held a ceremony in support of Sk'aliCh'elh-tenaut, and demanded she be released to her native waters. The totem pole journey is currently ongoing.

Some, such as the director of the University of British Columbia's Marine Mammal Research Unit, Andrew Trites, have argued that Lolita is too old for life in the wild and that reintroducing her to the ocean after over fifty years in captivity would be "unethical" and a "death sentence". However, other environmental scholars have posited that such arguments are representative of colonial conservation policies, stating that "The whales were killed and captured one at a time by settlers. If they can be killed or captured one at a time, there is no reason why the whales cannot be helped one at a time. Individual whales and pods can be cared for. 'Lolita' can be returned to her home waters."

Legal cases
In November 2011 Animal Legal Defense Fund (ALDF), PETA, and three individuals filed a lawsuit against the National Marine Fisheries Service (NMFS) to end the exclusion of Lolita from the Endangered Species Act (ESA) of the Pacific Northwest's southern resident orcas. NMFS reviewed ALDF's joint petition, along with the thousands of comments submitted by the public and found the petition merited. In February 2015, the NOAA announced it would issue a rule to include Lolita in the endangered species list. Previous to this, although the orca population that she was taken from is listed as endangered, as a captive animal, Lolita was exempted from this classification. This change does not impact on her captivity.

On March 18, 2014 a judge dismissed ALDF's case challenging Miami Seaquarium's Animal Welfare Act license to display captive orcas.

In June 2014 ALDF filed a notice of appeal of the District Court decision that found the USDA had not violated the law when it renewed Miami Seaquarium's AWA exhibitor license.

See also
 List of captive orcas
 List of individual cetaceans

References

External links
 Lolita: Slave to Entertainment film

Individual orcas
Southern resident orcas